The Division of Grayndler is an Australian electoral division in the state of New South Wales.

Grayndler covers most of Sydney's newly formed Inner West Council. The electorate includes the suburbs of Balmain, Birchgrove, Rozelle, Leichhardt, Lilyfield, Petersham, Enmore, Haberfield, Summer Hill and parts of Newtown, Ashfield, Dulwich Hill and Marrickville.

The current MP is Anthony Albanese, the Prime Minister of Australia and the Leader of the Australian Labor Party.

History
The division was created in 1949 and is named for Ted Grayndler (1867–1943), a Member of the New South Wales Legislative Council from 1921 to 1934 and 1936 to 1943, and General Secretary of the Australian Workers' Union from 1912 to 1941. The division was originally a solidly working-class area, although migration and gentrification have since radically changed its demography. Despite the demographic changes, it has been held by the Australian Labor Party for its entire existence; the Liberals have only once received 40 percent of the two-party vote. Grayndler also has a very high percentage of Australian Greens voters with 23 percent of the primary vote at the 2013 election. At the 2010 election, the two-party-preferred vote was between Labor and the Greens, one of only 3 in Australia (the others being Batman and the Greens held Melbourne).

Its most prominent members have been Fred Daly, who was a minister in the Whitlam government, Leo McLeay, who was Speaker of the House 1989–93, and Anthony Albanese, the present member for the seat. Albanese was a minister in the Rudd and Gillard governments, Deputy Prime Minister for three months in 2013, and is currently the leader of the Labor Party (since 2019) and Prime Minister of Australia (since 2022).

Daly was succeeded by Tony Whitlam at the 1975 election, the election that Whitlam's father and Labor Party leader Gough Whitlam had lost. The younger Whitlam served only one term before losing preselection to Frank Stewart, who transferred from the abolished neighbouring Division of Lang. Stewart died in office in 1979 and the seat was won by McLeay in the subsequent by-election.

When Transport Minister Graham Richardson was briefly forced out of cabinet due to the Marshall Islands affair before the 1993 election, Albanese, who was a left-wing power-broker in the party, arranged for fellow left-winger Jeannette McHugh to be promoted to the ministry. McHugh's seat of Phillip was due to be abolished in the election. Being a minister allowed her to be entitled to a seat, so she transferred to Grayndler. This forced McLeay to transfer from Grayndler to Watson. McHugh retired in 1996 and handed the seat to Albanese, who still holds it today.

Boundaries
Since 1984, federal electoral division boundaries in Australia have been determined at redistributions by a redistribution committee appointed by the Australian Electoral Commission. Redistributions occur for the boundaries of divisions in a particular state, and they occur every seven years, or sooner if a state's representation entitlement changes or when divisions of a state are malapportioned.

At , it is Australia's smallest electorate, located in the inner-southern Sydney metropolitan area, including parts of the inner-west. The electorate includes the suburbs of Balmain, Balmain East, Birchgrove, Dobroyd Point, Enmore, Haberfield, Leichhardt, Lewisham, Lilyfield, Petersham, Rodd Island, Rozelle, and Sydenham; as well as parts of Annandale, Ashfield, Camperdown, Canterbury, Cockatoo Island, Drummoyne, Dulwich Hill, Hurlstone Park, Macdonaldtown, Marrickville, Newtown, Spectacle Island, St Peters, Stanmore and Summer Hill.

Members

Election results

References

External links
 Division of Grayndler – Australian Electoral Commission

Electoral divisions of Australia
Constituencies established in 1949
1949 establishments in Australia